This is a list of players who have played at least one game for the St. Louis Blues of the National Hockey League (NHL) from 1967–68 to present.

Key
  Appeared in a Blues game during the 2020–2021 season.
  Hockey Hall of Famer, Stanley Cup, or retired number.



Bold denotes players who have played at least one game for the Blues and continue to belong/play for the Blues organization (including minor league affiliates).
Note: Stats are updated through to the end of the 2020-2021 season

Goaltenders

Skaters

References
HockeyDB.com

St. Louis Blues
 
players